Nick Jr. is a TV channel aimed at an audience of preschool children.
	 
Nick Jr. or  Nickelodeon Junior may also refer to:

Regional versions
Nick Jr. (Africa)
Nick Jr. (Arabia)
Nick Jr. (Australia and New Zealand)
Nick Jr. (CIS), in Russian
Nickelodeon Junior, a TV channel in France
Nick Jr. (Germany)
Nick Jr India
Nick Jr. (Italy)
Nick Jr. (Latin America)
Nick Jr. (Netherlands & Flanders)
Nick Jr. (Poland), an MTV channel
Nick Jr. (Portugal)
Nick Jr. (Scandinavia)
Nick Jr. (Spain)
Nick Jr. (South East Asia)
Nick Jr. (Turkey)
Nick Jr. (UK & Ireland)

Programming blocks
Nick Jr. (block), a block of programming on Nickelodeon US
Nick Jr. (Greece)
Nick Jr. on CBS, a defunct block	 
Nick Jr., a block on Nickelodeon Canada

See also
Nick Jr. 2, a second TV channel in the UK and Ireland